Phyllonorycter cerasicolella is a moth of the family Gracillariidae. It is known from all of Europe, except northern Scandinavia.

The wingspan is 7–8 mm. The posterior tarsi are whitish. Forewings are golden-orange; a white median streak from base to near middle; dorsum narrowly white towards base; four costal and three dorsal shining white anteriorly blackish-margined wedge-shaped spots; a black apical strigula, edged above with white. Hindwings are grey. The larva is pale yellow; head dark brown or black; plate of segment 2 orange-yellow.

There are two to three generations per year in western Europe.

The larvae feed on Prunus cerasifera, Prunus mahaleb and sometimes Prunus spinosa, as well as various cultivated Prunus species. Mines may also occur on Malus species when grown in proximity of cultivated Prunus. They mine the leaves of their host plant. They create a lower-surface tentiform mine, usually between two side veins, without clear folds.

References

External links
Lepiforum.de

cerasicolella
Moths of Europe
Moths described in 1855